Wheels Are Turnin' is the eleventh studio album by REO Speedwagon, released in November 1984. It reached No. 7 on the Billboard 200. The lead single was "I Do' Wanna Know," which stalled at #29 on the Billboard Hot 100.  The second single, "Can't Fight This Feeling," was REO's second and longest-running number one single.  Other singles released were "One Lonely Night" and "Live Every Moment".  These singles also reached the Top 40 of the Billboard Hot 100, reaching #19 and #34, respectively. The singles from the album also had success on other Billboard charts: "Can't Fight This Feeling" and "I Do' Wanna Know" each reached #5 on the Mainstream Rock chart, with "One Lonely Night" reaching #17, and "Can't Fight This Feeling" and "One Lonely Night" reached #3 and #10, respectively on the Adult Contemporary chart.

Billboard writer Kim Freeman suggested that the release of "I Do' Wanna Know" before "Can't Fight This Feeling" could be regarded as an "oversight."  However, lead singer Kevin Cronin, who wrote both songs, disagreed, stating "not all singles are released to be hits."  Paul Grein attributed the initial sluggish sales of Wheels Are Turnin before the release of "Can't Fight This Feeling" to the fact that "I Do' Wanna Know" was not successful with pop radio stations and noted that sales began to take off only after the release of the second single.

In 2013, the album was released on CD by UK-based company Rock Candy Records, with expanded liner notes and photos.  The LP version contained a cut-out stroboscope.

Track listing

Charts

 Personnel REO Speedwagon Kevin Cronin - lead and backing vocals, acoustic guitar, rhythm guitar on "Thru the Window"
 Gary Richrath - electric guitar
 Neal Doughty - keyboards
 Bruce Hall - bass
 Alan Gratzer - drumsAdditional personnel'
 Steve Forman – percussion
 Tommy Funderburk – backing vocals 
 Tom Kelly – backing vocals
 Richard Page – backing vocals

Production 
 Kevin Cronin – producer, arrangements 
 Alan Gratzer – producer 
 Gary Richrath – producer 
 David DeVore – assistant producer, engineer 
 Julian Stoll – assistant engineer 
 Steve Hall – mastering at Future Disc (Hollywood, California).
 John Kosh – art direction, design 
 Ron Larson – art direction, design
 Randee St. Nicholas – photography

References

 REO Speedwagon – Wheels Are Turnin' @ MSN Music

REO Speedwagon albums
1984 albums
Epic Records albums
Albums produced by Gary Richrath
Albums produced by Kevin Cronin